Four-time champion Fabiola Zuluaga failed to defend her title after losing to Lourdes Domínguez Lino in the semifinals. The loss also ends Zuluaga's 17-match winning streak at her home soil.

Flavia Pennetta won the title by defeating Lourdes Domínguez Lino 7–6(7–4), 6–4 in the final.

Seeds

Draw

Finals

Top half

Bottom half

References
 Official results archive (ITF)
 Official results archive (WTA)

Copa Colsanitas Seguros Bolivar - Singles
2005 Singles